The second cabinet of Hjalmar Branting was the cabinet of Sweden between 13 October 1921 and 19 April 1923.

In the general election, 1921 the Swedish Social Democratic Party got 36,2% of the votes and Hjalmar Branting got the majority to form a government.

The discussions in the beginning of the 1920s concerning the trade of alcohol, had forced all of the parties to take position. In 1920 the congress of the Social Democratic Party declared that The Riksdag shouldn't accept a ban of alcohol if not the referendum gave two-thirds majority for a ban. The government ordered a prohibition referendum, that ended with a meagre majority for the opposition.

In 1922, the Riksdag had decided that employees in a labour market conflict shouldn't get unemployment support. I the beginning of 1923 a conflict emerged within the industry and 4 000 workers got suspended from supportive by the unemployment commission. The government suggested in a proposition to the Riksdag that the right to support should remain for the workers that have been in unemployment for at least six months. When the proposition didn't pass the first chamber the government resigned at 6 April 1923.

Ministers and Ministries

External links
The Government and the Government Offices of Sweden

Cabinets of Sweden
1921 establishments in Sweden
1923 disestablishments in Sweden
Cabinets established in 1921
Cabinets disestablished in 1923